The Southfield Pavilion is a convention center in Southfield, Michigan.  It was built in 1978.  The pavilion features  of space and can seat up to 2,000 for banquets, lectures and other special events.  Adjacent are seven meeting rooms seating up to 250.

References

External links
 City of Southfield - Southfield Pavilion 

Convention centers in Michigan
Southfield, Michigan
Buildings and structures in Oakland County, Michigan
Event venues established in 1978
1978 establishments in Michigan